Keroplatus is a genus of predatory fungus gnats in the family Keroplatidae. Several species are bioluminescent.

Selected Species
Some species within this genus include:
K. apicalis Adams, 1903
K. biformis Okada, 1938
K. carbonarius Bosc, 1803
K. clausus Coquillett, 1901
K. militaris Johannsen, 1910
K. nipponicus Okada, 1938
K. reaumurii Dufour, 1839
K. samiri Khalaf, 1971
K. terminalis Coquillett, 1905
K. testaceus (Dalman, 1818)
K. tipuloides (Bosc, 1792)

References

Further reading

External links

 

Keroplatidae
Sciaroidea genera
Bioluminescent insects
Taxa named by Louis Augustin Guillaume Bosc